Marine Johannès (born 21 January 1995) is a French basketball player for the New York Liberty of the Women's National Basketball Association (WNBA) and for Lyon Asvel Feminin in the French League. A native of Lisieux in Cavaldos, she also plays for the French national team, where she participated at the 2016 Summer Olympics and the 2020 Summer Olympics.
 
A creative player who is very instinctive with the ball in her hands, she is well-known for having excellent passing and shooting skills.

Europe

Early career
Marine Johannès started basketball when she was 8 at the club of Pont-l'Évêque, the same one as Nicolas Batum. She was noticed by Samuel Vallée, who made her join at 12 the basketball club USO Mondeville. With that team, she won the U17 French League two times, in 2011 and 2012, and the U17 French Cup in 2012. Her team also won the Youth French League in 2013.

Pro
It's in Mondeville, a team evolving in LFB, the first division in France, that she had her first professional experience during the 2011-12 season at 17 years old. She had her breakthrough year during the 2015-16 season, averaging 14.2 points and 4.4 assists in 34 minutes. After that season, she joined Bourges, having her first experience in EuroLeague. She was two times in the All-LFB First Team, during the 2017-18 and 2018-19 seasons. On a European level, Bourges lost in the quarter-finals of EuroLeague each of her three years with the team. During her 2018–19 season, she averaged 15.1 points and 4.7 assists in Euroleague. That season, she was named Best Guard and Most Entertaining Player of the EuroLeague regular season.

In 2019, she signed a 3 years contract with the winner of the French League Lyon ASVEL, a club owned by Tony Parker. Her first season was interrupted by COVID while her team was first in the standings. She was also named in the All-Euroleague 2nd team this shorten season. During the 2020-21 season, she had a career high 38 points against USK Praha and was in the All-Euroleague 2nd team again. In the French League, she was named in the First Team for the third time of her career but her team lost in the semi-finals, resulting in them playing the EuroCup and not the EuroLeague the next season, the first time in that competition for Johannès in her career. The 2021-22 season wasn't a big team success for Lyon ASVEL, losing in the quarterfinals of EuroCup against Çukurova Basketbol, ending 3rd of the LFB regular season and losing in the finals against Johannès' previous team Bourges, making them play in Eurocup again the next season. Neither was it a good individual season for Johannès who was for the first time not nominated in the All-LFB First Team since the creation of the award and having her stats going slightly down, including her shooting percentage in LFB going from 49.2% the previous season to 41.8%.

WNBA
Johannes went undrafted in the 2017 WNBA draft. She was signed in 2019 by the New York Liberty. She averaged 7.2 points in 19 minutes that season. She had a few high scoring games, including back-to-back career high with a 21 points game against Connecticut followed by a 22 one against Washington. In February 2020, it was announced that she signed a multi-year deal with the Liberty. However, because of the COVID pandemic, she was suspended for the 2020 season. She didn't play the 2021 season either because of overseas commitment, having both the EuroBasket and the Olympic Games to play that summer. On June 8th, the Liberty announced that she would join the team for the 2022 season. She improved her career high in points by scoring 23 points in a loss against the Seattle Storm on June 20th 2022.

WNBA career statistics

Regular season

|-
| align="left" | 2019
| align="left" | New York
| 19 || 0 || 18.2 || .436 || .379 || .789 || 1.8 || 2.4 || 0.4 || 0.2 || 1.2 || 7.2
|-
| align="left" | 2022
| align="left" | New York
| 24 || 10 || 25.5 || .464 || .437 || .870 || 1.7 || 3.4 || 0.6 || 0.1 || 1.8 || 10.0
|-
| align="left" | Career
| align="left" | 2 years, 1 team
| 43 || 10 || 22.3 || .453 || .417 || .833 || 1.7 || 3.0 || 0.5 || 0.1 || 1.5 || 8.8

Playoffs

|-
| align="left" | 2022
| align="left" | New York
| 3 || 1 || 23.0 || .429 || .400 || 1.000 || 2.3 || 4.3 || 1.7 || 0.0 || 2.0 || 5.7
|-
| align="left" | Career
| align="left" | 1 year, 1 team
| 3 || 1 || 23.0 || .429 || .400 || 1.000 || 2.3 || 4.3 || 1.7 || 0.0 || 2.0 || 5.7

French National Team

Marine Johannes played her first game with her senior national team on November 25th 2015 against the Netherlands where she scored 15 points. She was part of the team selected for the 2016 Summer Olympics and, at 21 years old, the youngest player on the roster. Her most noticeable game of the tournament was against the United States in the semi-finals with 13 points, including a crossover followed by a three pointer on basketball legend Maya Moore. France lost to Serbia in the bronze medal game, with 3 points on 1/9 shooting from Johannes.

She was of the 2017, 2019 and 2021 Eurobasket rosters for France that all end up with a silver medal for France. She took part of the 2020 Tokyo Olympics where France won the bronze medal.

Career highlights and awards

As a player
 Most Entertaining Player in EuroLeague : season 2018–19
 Best Guard in EuroLeague : season 2018–19
 2nd All-EuroLeague Team : seasons 2019–20 and 2020–21
 All-LFB (French League) First Team : seasons 2017–18, 2018–19 and 2020–21

As a team

National Team
 Bronze Medal at the 2020 Summer Olympics
 Silver Medal at the 2017 EuroBasket (Czech Republic)
 Silver Medal at the 2019 EuroBasket (Serbia/Latvia)
 Silver Medal at the 2021 EuroBasket (Spain/France)

Club
 Winner of the  : 2017, 2018 and 2019
 Winner of the French League : 2018
 Finalist of the French League : 2022

References

External links

1995 births
Living people
Basketball players at the 2016 Summer Olympics
Basketball players at the 2020 Summer Olympics
French expatriate basketball people in the United States
French women's basketball players
New York Liberty
Olympic basketball players of France
People from Lisieux
Shooting guards
Sportspeople from Calvados (department)
France women's national basketball team players
Medalists at the 2020 Summer Olympics
Olympic bronze medalists for France
Olympic medalists in basketball